The University of Dallas School of Ministry began in 1987 as the Institute for Religious and Pastoral Studies (IRPS), offering master's degrees in theological studies (MTS) and religious education (MRE). The founders of the School of Ministry envisaged an institute dedicated to training ministers who could respond to pastoral needs in their local Church communities. 
As such, the School has adopted a “practitioner” model program so as to integrate preparation for practical ministry with study of the more abstract elements of theology. IRPS was renamed the School of Ministry in April, 2007.

The University of Dallas School of Ministry is one of the few Catholic universities in the U.S. that offer a comprehensive, four-year Catholic Biblical School (CBS) certification program. This program, which covers every book of the Bible, is also offered online and in both English and Spanish. The CBS is the largest program of its kind among all Catholic universities in the U.S. based on 2007 enrollment numbers.

The School of Ministry offers the nation's only Rome study program that is fully integrated into its master's degree programs. Courses are taught at the University's campus in Rome by members of the School's faculty and other top theological scholars.

The University of Dallas’ School of Ministry is the only Catholic school in the country to offer its entire Master of Theological Studies degree program and CBS program online, as well as selected courses in its other master's degree programs.

Graduate programs
The School of Ministry offers a variety of master's degrees and graduate certificates. Graduate students can pursue master's degrees in: Theological Studies (MTS), Religious Education (MRE), Catholic School Leadership (MCSL), Catholic School Teaching (MCST), and Pastoral Ministry (MPM).

Graduate Certificates are also available in the same fields.

Masters classes are offered onsite at the University of Dallas main campus at Irving (Texas), and at Frisco (Texas), Shreveport (Louisiana) as well as online. Onsite Classes are offered weekdays, weeknights and weekends. Online classes can be taken at any time during the week.

Biblical school
The School of Ministry Catholic Biblical School is a four-year program of intensive study covering the entire Bible.

Online education
Students can pursue a master's degree or the Biblical School online. The School of Ministry is a leading innovator in online theological education. The advanced technologies used by the School of Ministry mean it is one of the very few Catholic master's degrees in theology that can be done entirely online, with no residential or on-site requirements.

Deacon formation
The School of Ministry provides the academic component of deacon formation for the  dioceses of Tyler, Shreveport, and Dallas. Deacon formation is offered in both English and Spanish language.

Adult faith formation
This comprehensive program is offered over four years by the School of Ministry. The program offers college level classes for adults wanting to learn more about their faith. The program is open to people of all ages and backgrounds.

Student body
The School of Ministry has about 125 graduate students, 620 Biblical School students and 130 students in Adult Faith Formation and Deacon Formation programs. Most students are part-time students. On-site students come from the Dallas-Fort Worth Metroplex, surrounding parts of Texas. Online students come from all over the United States and around the world.

Faculty
The School of Ministry has ten full-time faculty and a number of part-time faculty. All full-time faculty teaching in the School of Ministry Graduate program hold a doctorate.

Off-campus education
The School of Ministry offers master's degrees on-site and online. School of Ministry conducts classes in satellite campuses including Frisco, TX.

External links
University of Dallas School of Ministry

University of Dallas
Seminaries and theological colleges in Texas
Educational institutions established in 1987
1987 establishments in Texas